"Get It On" is a single released by Intenso Project and the former Steps member Lisa Scott-Lee in 2004. It peaked at number 23 on the UK Singles Chart and number 38 in France but failed to make any impact on the American Billboard charts.

Track listing 
UK CD
(INSPMOS01CDS; released: 11 November 2004)
 "Get It On" (Radio Edit) - 2:49
 "Get It On" (Original Club Mix) - 6:47
 "Get It On" (DJ Bomba & Paolo Remix) - 8:11
 "Get It On" (Video)

UK 12" vinyl
(INSPMOS 01T; released: 11 November 2004)

Side A
 "Get It On" (Original Club Mix) - 6:47
Side B
 "Get It On" (DJ Bomba & Paolo Remix) - 8:11

UK CDr promo
(Released: August, 2004)
 "Get It On" (Original Club) - 6:44
 "Get It On" (DJ Bomba & Paolo Remix) - 8:09
 "Get It On" (Mark Jason Remix) - 6:13
 "Get It On" (Club Dub) - 7:30
 "Get It On" (Short Radio Edit) - 3:07
 "Get It On" (Radio Edit) - 3:29

UK 12" vinyl promo
(IP 001; released: 2 August 2004; Limited Edition)

Side A
 "Get It On" (Club Mix) - 6:35
Side B
 "Get It On" (Dub Mix) - 7:17

Australian CD
(BIGS008; released: 1 January 2005)
 "Get It On" (Radio Edit) - 3:33
 "Get It On" (Original Club Mix) - 6:47
 "Get It On" (DJ Bomba & Paolo Remix) - 8:11
 "Get It On" (Mark Jason Remix) - 6:15
 "Get It On" (Video)

US CD
(76869-72124-2; released: 22 February 2005)
 "Get It On" (Radio Edit) - 3:07
 "Get It On" (Original Club Mix) - 6:47
 "Get It On" (Mark Jason Remix) - 6:15
 "Get It On" (DJ Bomba & Paolo Remix) - 8:11
 "Get It On" (Instrumental) - 3:29

US 12" vinyl
(76869-72124-1; released: 22 February 2005)

Side A
 "Get It On" (Original Club Mix) - 6:46
 "Get It On" (DJ Bomba & Paolo Remix) - 8:10
Side B
 "Get It On" (Mark Jason Remix) - 6:15
 "Get It On" (Radio Edit) - 3:07

US 12" vinyl promo
(76869-72124-1; released: 2005)

Side A
 "Get It On" (Original Club Mix) - 6:46
 "Get It On" (DJ Bomba & Paola Mix) - 8:10
Side B
 "Get It On" (Mark Jason Remix) - 6:15
 "Get It On" (Radio Edit) - 3:07

French CD
(Released: 2005)
 "Get It On" (Radio Edit) - 3:07
 "Get It On" (Original Club Mix) - 6:47

Charts

References

2004 singles
Lisa Scott-Lee songs
2004 songs
Songs written by Ben Ofoedu